Walter Massop (10 October 1907 – 10 September 1979) was a Dutch wrestler. He competed in the men's Greco-Roman lightweight at the 1928 Summer Olympics.

References

External links
 

1907 births
1979 deaths
Dutch male sport wrestlers
Olympic wrestlers of the Netherlands
Wrestlers at the 1928 Summer Olympics
Sportspeople from Hamburg